Tigranes I of Armenia was an Artaxiad king of Armenia at the end of 2nd and the beginning of 1st century BC. Few records have survived about his and his predecessor Artavasdes I's reign, which has led to some confusion. Some modern scholars have doubted that such a king reigned at all. Other historians, such as Manandian, Lang and Adalian consider him a real figure but differ or are uncertain on the exact dates of his reign. Although it has been proposed that Tigranes I reigned from 123 BC to 96 BC, this view has been criticized. Another suggestion is that Tigranes I ruled in 120 BC - 95 BC and this has been recently corroborated by historian Christian Marek.

Name
The name Tigránēs is the Greek form of Old Iranian Tigrāna (Armenian  - Tigran). The exact etymology is disputed but it is likely an Old Iranian patronymic formation of the suffix *-āna- and the name *Tigrā- (meaning "slender"). Armenian historian Movses Khorenatsi in his work mentions a Tiran, "son of Artaxias and brother of Artavasdes", who has been identified as Tigranes I.

Background 
Currently, Tigranes I is assumed to be the fourth oldest son of five between Artaxias I and Satenik. He ascended to the throne due to Artavasdes I not having an available heir, as well as his other brothers being kicked out of the royal estates by Artavasdes I. He was made Sparapet over the western army by Artaxias I.

After the departure of Artaxias's most trusted general, Smbat Bagratuni, Tigranes's brother, Mazhan, requested King Artaxias that Artavasdes's and Tigranes's roles be stripped from the army and instead be entrusted to Zariadres. Artaxias rejected the request and Mazhan began plotting against Tigranes. However Artavasdes and Tigranes caught wind of the plot and ambushed and killed Mazhan during a hunting trip. They then buried him at Bagaran.

Seleucid and Iberian Invasion 
In 165/4 BC, the Seleucid army, led by Antiochus IV Epiphanes, invaded Armenia and defeated Tigranes's army, forcing him to retreat to Basen and await for aid from Artavasdes I and Smbat Bagratuni. Eventually the Armenian army would defeat the Seleucid Army, and would have to return back to Syria due to internal troubles at home. Tigranes's brother, Zariadres would be captured after a defeat in Javakhk, three years later Tigranes, Artavasdes, and Smbat would march towards Trialeti, but negotiate for Zariadres's freedom, as well as scoring an alliance with the Iberian kingdom while ceding Javakhk and Ardahan.

Parthian Invasion 
Following the defeat of Artavasdes I, he was forced to give Tigranes's son, Tigranes II, to Mithradates II and recognize Parthian suzerainty over Armenia.

Reign
After the death of Artavasdes I, Tigranes I ascended to the throne in 120 BC. Manandian, citing Strabo, mentions that Tigranes I put a strong resistance against the Parthians and successfully defended Armenia and faced no conflict afterwards. He would also strip the Vahevunis of their priesthood after finding out that they had moved the gold plated statue of Vahagn located in Armavir to their domain in Ashtishat after the death of Artaxias I.

According to Khorenatsi, Tigranes owned two horses that, as he described, were faster than pegasus. He would enter into a sort of rivalry with a Bznuni prince named Datake, who boasted that he was richer than the king. Tigranes would also have to deal with inheritance issues of his and other's families, as his relatives living in the region of Hashteank complained that there wasn't enough land to divide. Tigranes told them to move to Aghiovit or Arberan, however they protested. Eventually Tigranes told them that they either move to Arberan or Aghiovit or split what they had among themselves. Seeing that not enough land could be split among themselves in Hashteank, some of the Artaxiads moved.

Tigranes would also give away Artavasdes's holdings to an Andzevatsi prince named Erakhnavu, who was a distinguished man and had married the last of Artavasdes's wives. He would eventually be made second rank and sparapet of the eastern army. He would also take care of Druasp, a Persian friend who had become related by marriage to the princes of Vaspurakan and was given the town of Tateawn and its estates, and vineyards as well as establishing his court in the town of Chrmes in the region of Yekegheats.

Tigranes married his daughter Eraneak to a man named Trdat Bagratuni, who was the son of Smbatuhi, the daughter of Smbat Bagratuni. Eraneak hater her husband, complaining about Trdat's ugly appearance. This angered Trdat and he beat Ereneak severely, dragging her outside. He then entered in rebellion to secure the regions of Media, however upon arriving in Syunik, would receive the news of Tigranes's death and ended the rebellion. Tigranes would die in a snowstorm in around 95 BC.

After his death, Tigranes II, who was given as hostage to the Parthians by Artavasdes I, returned from his captivity in Parthia and assumed the throne. According to Appian, Tigranes II was the son Tigranes I. This view has also been supported by modern research.

Barring the conflict with Parthians, the reign of Tigranes I has been described as generally peaceful and devoid of major external events.

Coinage

According to Kovacs, only three types of coins have been attributed to Tigranes I, all inscribed in Greek with ΒΑΣΙΛΕΩΣ ΜΕΓΑΛΟΥ ΤΙΓΡΑΝΟΥ ("King Tigranes the Great") and depicting Tigranes I wearing a five-pointed Tiara. The reverses of these coins either depicts an eagle standing, a cornucopia with a grape cluster, or a thunderbolt.

Following the death of Tigranes I, his son Tigranes II would proclaim him as a god and mint coins under his image inscribed with ΒΑΣΙΛΕΩΣ ΜΕΓΑΛΟΥ ΤΙΓΡΑΝΟΥ ΘΕΟΥ (King Tigranes the Great and Divine). Six of these coins would be issued, three of which being minted in Artaxata and the other three minted in Tigranocerta. The reverses of these coins either depict an elephant, horse, lion, or the goddess Nike holding a wreath or palm.

Some numismatists such as Bedoukian and Nupertlian have argued that the coins depicting a crude bust of a beardless king facing left is attributed to Tigranes I. However, Kovacs attributes them to Tigranes II, citing the regnal year visible on the reverse. They were also minted in Nisibis, which was not under Armenian control during the time of Tigranes I.

Family
Tigranes I had four brothers: his predecessor Artavasdes I, Zariadres, Vruyr and Mazhan. Although Alan princess Satenik has been shown to be Artaxias I's wife, there is no concrete evidence that she was their mother.

Tigranes I had two sons and a daughter, his successor Tigranes II and Guras, who is mentioned by Plutarch as the governor of Nisibis, and Eraneak, who was married off to Trdat Bagratuni. Guras was later captured by Roman general Lucullus. Judging by Roman author Lucian's Macrobii, Tigranes II was born to Tigranes I at  140 BC.

References

Bibliography
 
  
  
  
   
  
   
   
 
 
 
   
 
  
 
  
 
 
   
   
   
   
  
 
  
 

2nd-century BC births
95 BC deaths
2nd-century BC kings of Armenia
1st-century BC kings of Armenia
1st-century BC rulers in Asia
2nd-century BC rulers in Asia
Year of birth unknown
Artaxiad dynasty
Vassal rulers of the Parthian Empire